Alessandro Faria (born 7 June 1978), known as Bill, is a former footballer who played as a forward. Born and raised in Brazil, he has been naturalized by Togo and played for that national team.

Career
He was signed by BSV Schwarz-Weiß Rehden in November 2007, and returned to Brazil for Oeste de Chapecó in September 2008.

International career 
Bill made his Togo national team debut on June 8, 2003, in a 2004 African Cup of Nations Qualifying match against Cape Verde, in Lomé. That day Les Eperviers (the nickname of Togo national football team) won by 5-2 and he scored one of the Togolese goals.Bill also played for Togo against the Ghanaian club Asante Kotoko in a friendly match on 29 June 2003 in Stade de Kégué, Lomé.

International goals

References

External links 

1978 births
Living people
Footballers from Porto Alegre
Brazilian emigrants to Togo
Naturalized citizens of Togo
Togolese footballers
Togo international footballers
Togolese expatriate footballers
Expatriate soccer players in the United States
Expatriate footballers in Germany
Associação Atlética Ponte Preta players
El Paso Patriots players
Sociedade Esportiva e Recreativa Caxias do Sul players
Guarany Futebol Clube players
Associação Chapecoense de Futebol players
Clube 15 de Novembro players
Esporte Clube São José players
Esporte Clube Pelotas players
River Atlético Clube players
Esporte Clube Novo Hamburgo players
Clube Atlético Bragantino players
Clube Atlético Hermann Aichinger players
Clube Esportivo Aimoré players
Grêmio Esportivo Glória players
Association football forwards